The Wałbrzyskie Mountains or Waldenburg Mountains, sometimes called the Wałbrzyskie Highlands or Waldenburg Highlands, is one of the three mountain ranges that form the western part of the Central Sudetes. The other ranges are the Owl Mountains and the Falcon Mountains.

Geography 
The Wałbrzyskie Mountains lie almost entirely within Poland. Several southern ridges reach as far as the Czech Republic. The range extends to the west and southwest of the Lower Silesian town of Wałbrzych (Waldenburg). The Owl and Falcon Mountains to the southeast form a continuation of the Wałbrzyskie Highlands. To the west of the highlands in the Western Sudetes are the adjoining ranges of the Bober-Katzbach Mountains and the Landeshut Ridge.

Division of the Wałbrzych Mountains 
The Wałbrzych Mountains are divided into three separate parts:

 Trójgarb and Krąglak Massif 
 Chełmiec Massif 
 Black Mountains

References

External links 

Góry Kamienne: Information, description and photographs (Polish)
Góry Wałbrzyskie: Information, description and photographs (Polish)

Sudetes
Mountain ranges of Poland